Hotzendorf may refer to:
 Hodslavice, a Czech village whose German name is Hotzendorf
 Franz Conrad von Hötzendorf, an Austrian general